John Dow may refer to:
 John Dow (Australian politician) (1837–1923), Australian politician
 John Dow (footballer) (1873–?), Scottish footballer
 John G. Dow (1905–2003), U.S. Representative from New York
 John K. Dow (1861–1961), American architect
 John T. Dow, Wisconsin legislator